Brennania belkini is a species of fly in the horse-fly family, Tabanidae. It is native to the Los Angeles area in California, and it is also found in Mexico. It is known commonly as Belkin's dune tabanid fly.

References

Tabanidae
Insects described in 1966
Fauna of California
Diptera of North America
Taxonomy articles created by Polbot
Taxa named by Cornelius Becker Philip